The Hardest Thing may refer to:

The Hardest Thing (album), an album by Toše Proeski
"The Hardest Thing" (Toše Proeski song)
"The Hardest Thing" (98 Degrees song), a 1999 single by 98 Degrees
"The Hardest Thing" (Amphibia), the series finale of Amphibia